Rakitnica is the main tributary of the first section of the Neretva river, also called Upper Neretva. It meets Neretva from the right, flowing from north to south, between Bjelašnica and Visočica mountains.

Geography
The Rakitnica river begins as Crna Rijeka (English = Black River) from "Zucina Vrela" (English = "Zuco's Wellsprings") that emerges in the areal above Rakitnica village under the northwestern ridge of Treskavica mountain, and after a short run, cca. 2 kilometers, and confluence with Glibovac creek it becomes Rakitnica.
The Rakitnica river forms a 26 km long canyon, on its 33 km long stretch, carved between Bjelašnica and Visočica, southeast from Sarajevo.

There is a hiking trail along the ridge of the Rakitnica canyon, all the way to famous village of Lukomir. The village, inhabited by Bosniaks, is the only remaining semi-nomadic traditional mountain village in Bosnia and Herzegovina.
At almost 1,500m, Lukomir, with its unique stone homes with cherry-wood roof tiles, is also the highest and most isolated. Indeed, access to the village is impossible from the first snows in November until late April and sometimes even later, except by skis or on foot. A newly constructed lodge is now complete to receive guests and hikers.

Protection
Bosnia and Herzegovina on several occasions, since 1998, was preparing to establish a large national park which, according to developed but never operationalized plans, would comprise the entire region of Gornja Neretva, including the Rakitnica river.

See also

Water bodies
 Neretva
 Upper Neretva
 Lađanica
 Boračko Lake
 Mostarska Bijela
 Rama
 Buna river
 Bunica
 Trebižat
 Bregava
 Krupa River
 Trebišnjica

Settlements
 Lukomir
 Blace (Konjic)
 Glavatičevo
 Konjic

Protected environment and treasures
 Blatačko Lake
 Lukomir
 Stara Ćuprija 
 List of national parks of BiH

Nature and culture
 Salmo obtusirostris 
 Salmo dentex
 Salmo marmoratus
 Environmental impacts of dams
 Environment and electricity generation
 Tourism in Bosnia and Herzegovina
 Stećci 
 Bogomilism
 Treskavica
 Bjelašnica
 Visočica
 List of ancient tribes in Illyria
 List of Illyrian cities

External links
 Glavatičevo
 ZELENI-NERETVA Konjic NGO For Preservation Of The Neretva River And Environment Protection
 Declaration For The Protection Of The Neretva River for download - Declaration Initiator, ZELENI-NERETVA Konjic NGO For Preservation Of The Neretva River And Environment Protection
 WWF Panda - Living Neretva
 Regional Programme for Cultural and Natural Heritage in South East Europe Council of Europe - Directorate of Culture, Cultural and Natural Heritage
 Balkan Trout Restoration Group Site
 Center of expertise on hydropower impacts on fish and fish habitat, Canada
 REC Transboundary Cooperation Through the Management of Shared Natural Resources
 Bosnia and Herzegovina Commission for Preservation of National Monuments
 International Rivers
 Interactive site that demonstrates dams' effects on rivers
 Municipal Website of Konjic 
 Website of Konjic 
 Konjicani
 Neretva.org Open Project
 Rafting Neretva
 Ambasada Neretva Rafting

References

Rivers of Bosnia and Herzegovina
Tourist attractions in Bosnia and Herzegovina
Tourism in Bosnia and Herzegovina
Protected areas of Bosnia and Herzegovina
Nature conservation in Bosnia and Herzegovina
Environment of Bosnia and Herzegovina
Canyons and gorges of Bosnia and Herzegovina
Upper Neretva